Pushkar films is a production house created by Pushkara Mallikarjunaiah who hails from Tumkuru District of Karnataka.

Films produced

References

Film production companies based in Bangalore
2016 establishments in Karnataka
Indian companies established in 2016
Mass media companies established in 2016